Ramchandra Bade was an Indian politician from the state of Madhya Pradesh belonging to the Bharatiya Janata Party (earlier Bharatiya Jana Sangh).

He was elected to the legislative assembly of Madhya Bharat (now Madhya Pradesh), as well as Lok Sabha, the lower house of the Parliament of India, from Khargone.

References

Further reading

External links
 Nalini Bade Agarwal, 1942-2020 (obituary of the daughter), retrieved 1 May 2022.
Official biographical sketch in Parliament of India website

Lok Sabha members from Madhya Pradesh
India MPs 1962–1967
India MPs 1971–1977
Bharatiya Jana Sangh politicians
1905 births
Year of death missing